The China men's national handball team is the national team of China. It is governed by the Chinese Handball Association and takes part in international team handball competitions.

Results

Summer Olympics
2008 – 12th place

World Championship
1997 – 20th place
1999 – 20th place

Asian Games
1982 –  Gold Medal
1986 –  Silver Medal
1990 – 4th place
1994 –  Bronze Medal
1998 – 6th place
2002 – 7th place
2006 – 11th place
2010 – 7th place
2014 – 10th place

Asian Championship
1977 –  Bronze Medal
1979 –  Silver Medal
1987 – 4th place
1989 – 4th place
1991 –  Bronze Medal
1993 – 5th place
1995 – 5th place
2000 –  Silver Medal
2006 – 8th place
2008 – 7th place
2010 – 9th place
2014 – 11th place
2016 – 9th place
2018 – 9th place
2020 – 11th place

IHF Emerging Nations Championship
2015 – 10th place
2017 – 6th place
2019 – 6th place

External links

IHF profile

Handball
China
Hand